Three referendums were held in Liechtenstein during 2000. The first was held on 27 February on amending the law promoting cheap living, and was rejected by 66.3% of voters. The second was held on 18 June on the law on gaining and losing citizenship of the country, and was approved by 50.1% of voters, a margin of just 15 votes. The third on 24 September concerned an agreement with neighbouring Switzerland on performance related tax on heavy load traffic, and was approved by 71% of voters.

Results

Amendment to the law on cheap living

Citizenship

Heavy load traffic

References

2000 referendums
2000 in Liechtenstein
Referendums in Liechtenstein